Pravdolyub is a village in Ardino Municipality, Kardzhali Province, southern-central Bulgaria. It covers an area of 4.436 square kilometres and as of 2007 it had a population of 204 people.

References

Villages in Kardzhali Province